The cast of the television series MythBusters perform experiments to verify or debunk urban legends, old wives' tales, and the like. This is a list of the various myths tested on the show as well as the results of the experiments (the myth is either busted, plausible, or confirmed). The 2017 season premiered on November 15, in a Wednesday time slot, on the Science Channel.

This is the first season with new hosts Jon Lung and Brian Louden, and without Jamie Hyneman and Adam Savage.

Episode overview

Episode 249 – "Heads Will Roll"
 Original air date: November 15, 2017

Airbag Disaster

Delayed Casualty

Episode 250 – "Chimney Cannon"
 Original air date: November 22, 2017

Killer Chainsaw

Chimney Cannon

Episode 251 – "Earthquake Water Heater"
 Original air date: November 29, 2017

Earthquake Water Heater

Dutch Oven Explosion

Episode 252 – "Rock 'n' Roll Road Rage"
 Original air date: December 6, 2017

Killer Carp

Rock 'n' Roll Road Rage

Episode 253 – "Invisible Assassins"
 Original air date: December 13, 2017

Fire Extingisher Nail Gun

Shotgun Chandelier

Shotgun Floorboards

Episode 254 – "Dead Body Double"
 Original air date: December 20, 2017

Dead Body Double

Goo Gone Wild

References

General references

External links

 
 Discovery website
 

2017
2017 American television seasons